Battle-Edge is a former field, located beside Sheep Street and Tanners Lane, in Burford in Oxfordshire, England where King Æthelbald of Mercia was defeated by King Cuthred of the West Saxons in 752 AD.

Cuthred had been tributary to Æthelbald but, by winning the battle and taking the standard (a golden dragon), "threw off the Mercian yoke."

Gardner's Directory of Oxfordshire, 1852, reports that "As some workmen were making a road from Burford to Barrington, a few years since, they discovered a large stone sarcophagus of very rude workmanship, weighing nearly three tons, which on examination, was found to contain the remains of a human body, and portions of (apparently) a leathern cuirass studded with metal nails, completely oxidated and matted together. From the size and appearance of this coffin (which is still preserved in the church), and from the circumstance of its being found near to Battle Edge, it may be presumed it was deposited there after the battle between Æthelbald and Cuthred above noticed."

Parks and open spaces in Oxfordshire
Battlefields in the United Kingdom
Military history of Oxfordshire
Burford